Asociación Pro Derechos de la Mujer was a women's organization in Argentina, founded in 1919.

It was founded by Elvira Rawson, Adelina Di Carlo, Emma Day and Alfonsina Storn in 1919. It played an important role for the struggle for women's suffrage in Argentina. They also engaged in other issues, and played an important role within reforms in women's working rights.

References 

1910s establishments in Argentina
Feminism and history
Feminist organisations in Argentina
Organizations established in 1919
Social history of Argentina
Voter rights and suffrage organizations
Women's suffrage in Argentina